Alfred Thompson Bricher (April 10, 1837 – September 30, 1908) was a painter associated with White Mountain art and the Hudson River School.

Life and work
Bricher was born in Portsmouth, New Hampshire.  He was educated in an academy at Newburyport, Massachusetts. He began his career as a businessman in Boston, Massachusetts. When not working, he studied at the Lowell Institute. He also studied with Albert Bierstadt, William Morris Hunt, and others. He attained noteworthy skill in making landscape studies from nature, and after 1858 devoted himself to the art as a profession. He opened a studio in Boston, and met with some success there. In 1868 he moved to New York City, and at the National Academy of Design that year he exhibited “Mill-Stream at Newburyport.” Soon afterward he began to use watercolors in preference to oils, and in 1873 was chosen a member of the American Watercolor Society. In the 1870s, he primarily did maritime themed paintings, with attention to watercolor paintings of landscape, marine, and coastwise scenery. He often spent summers in Grand Manan, where he produced such notable works as Morning at Grand Manan (1878). In 1879, Bricher was elected into the National Academy of Design as an Associate member.

Hudson River School

By the end of his life, the Hudson River School style of painting that included landscapes and luminism fell out of style, with Modern Art becoming the premier artistic movement. As his style of art faded, so did his fame.

Rediscovery

Over time Bricher's artwork gathered more attention and by the 1980s he began to be credited as one of the nineteenth century's greatest maritime painters. A self-taught luminist, he explored the effects of light and how it reflected, refracted, and absorbed on landscapes and seascapes.

Later life

As a lover of maritime life and the sea Bricher purchased a home in the 1890s close to the sea in the New Dorp section of Staten Island, where he had views of Lower New York Bay, the Atlantic Ocean, and Raritan Bay. He lived and painted at the shore in New Dorp until his death there, aged 71.

References

External links
 
American Paradise: The World of the Hudson River School, an exhibition catalog from The Metropolitan Museum of Art (fully available online as PDF), which contains material on Bricher (see index)
Gallery
Artwork by Alfred Thompson Bricher

1837 births
1908 deaths
19th-century American painters
American male painters
20th-century American painters
Painters from New Hampshire
Hudson River School painters
American landscape painters
Luminism (American art style)
American marine artists
People from Portsmouth, New Hampshire
People from New Dorp, Staten Island
Painters from New York City
National Academy of Design associates
19th-century American male artists
20th-century American male artists